The 1997–98 NBA season was the Timberwolves' 9th season in the National Basketball Association. During the off-season, the Timberwolves acquired Stanley Roberts from the Los Angeles Clippers, and later on signed free agent Tom Hammonds in November. In October, All-Star forward Kevin Garnett signed a six-year contract extension with the Timberwolves, which was worth more than $121 million. After a 4–1 start to the season, the team played around .500 before posting a seven-game winning streak in January. However, they would lose Tom Gugliotta for the remainder of the season to an ankle injury after 41 games. Chris Carr, who became the team's starting shooting guard this season, also went down with an ankle injury, only playing 51 games. At midseason, the team traded long-time guard Doug West to the Vancouver Grizzlies in exchange for Anthony Peeler. The Timberwolves held a 26–20 record at the All-Star break, and won seven of their final eight games posting their first winning record at 45–37, third in the Midwest Division, and making their second consecutive playoff appearance.

Garnett and second-year star Stephon Marbury both continued to establish themselves as two of the brightest stars in the NBA, as Garnett averaged 18.5 points, 9.6 rebounds, 1.7 steals and 1.8 blocks per game, and was selected for the 1998 NBA All-Star Game, while Marbury averaged 17.7 points, 8.6 assists and 1.3 steals per game. In addition, Gugliotta provided the team with 20.1 points, 8.7 rebounds and 1.5 steals per game, while Sam Mitchell provided with 12.3 points and 4.8 rebounds per game, Carr contributed 9.9 points per game, and Terry Porter contributed 9.5 points and 3.3 assists per game off the bench. On the defensive side, Cherokee Parks averaged 7.1 points and 5.5 rebounds per game, while Roberts contributed 6.2 points and 4.9 rebounds per game, and Hammonds provided with 6.1 points and 4.8 rebounds per game off the bench.

In the Western Conference First Round of the playoffs, the Timberwolves faced off against the 2nd-seeded Seattle SuperSonics. After losing Game 1 on the road, 108–83, the Timberwolves won their first ever playoff game with a 98–93 road win in Game 2. Despite taking a 2–1 series lead, the Timberwolves would lose the next two games to the SuperSonics, thus losing the series in five games. 

Following the season, Gugliotta signed as a free agent with the Phoenix Suns, while Porter signed with the Miami Heat, Roberts signed with the Houston Rockets, Parks signed with the Vancouver Grizzlies, and the oft-injured Michael Williams, who returned to play for the Timberwolves for the first time in two years due to a left heel injury, was released to free agency.

Draft picks

Roster

Roster Notes
 Rookie center Paul Grant missed the entire season due to a foot injury.

Regular season

Season standings

z - clinched division title
y - clinched division title
x - clinched playoff spot

Record vs. opponents

Game log

Playoffs

|- align="center" bgcolor="#ffcccc"
| 1
| April 24
| @ Seattle
| L 83–108
| Kevin Garnett (18)
| Kevin Garnett (18)
| Stephon Marbury (5)
| KeyArena17,072
| 0–1
|- align="center" bgcolor="#ccffcc"
| 2
| April 26
| @ Seattle
| W 98–93
| Stephon Marbury (25)
| Anthony Peeler (14)
| Stephon Marbury (7)
| KeyArena17,072
| 1–1
|- align="center" bgcolor="#ccffcc"
| 3
| April 28
| Seattle
| W 98–90
| Anthony Peeler (20)
| Kevin Garnett (8)
| Stephon Marbury (11)
| Target Center19,006
| 2–1
|- align="center" bgcolor="#ffcccc"
| 4
| April 30
| Seattle
| L 88–92
| Kevin Garnett (20)
| Kevin Garnett (10)
| Stephon Marbury (7)
| Target Center19,006
| 2–2
|- align="center" bgcolor="#ffcccc"
| 5
| May 2
| @ Seattle
| L 84–97
| Anthony Peeler (28)
| Reggie Jordan (8)
| Stephon Marbury (8)
| KeyArena17,072
| 2–3
|-

Player statistics

Season

Playoffs

Awards and records

Transactions

References

See also
 1997-98 NBA season

Minnesota Timberwolves seasons
Timber
Timber
Monnesota